Heavenly Court is a Russian supernatural legal drama television miniseries written and directed by Alena Zvantsova. The premiere took place in 2011 (four episodes) and four more episodes were aired in 2014. On the basis of the series, a full-length film was created.

Plot
After death, each person appears before the court which sends the soul either to the "sector of repose" or the "sector of meditations". The last act of man is weighed on the scales of justice in which his entire previous life is reflected. But to give a correct assessment of this act is sometimes very difficult. For this, there is the heavenly court where they are judged by people who died a little earlier and have been sentenced to this work, which in essence is also a "sector of meditations" ...

Cast
Konstantin Khabensky – Andrei, prosecutor of the first stage
Mikhail Porechenkov – Veniamin, second stage lawyer
Daniela Stojanovic – Veronica Mitrovic, widow of Andrei
Nikita Zverev – Nikita Mikhailovich Lazarev, the new satellite of Veronica
Ingeborga Dapkūnaitė – employee of the Morpheus Dream Department
Igor Gordin – Alex, Senior Inquisitor / Dylan Jay Bailey
Dmitry Maryanov – the body for returning to the world of the living
Anna Mikhalkova – Lucia Arkadievna, dentist
Oleg Mazurov – Antonio Luigi Amore
Arthur Waha – Sergio Amore
Sergei Barkovsky – Savva Mefodyevich, the defendant
Yevgenia Dobrovolskaya – Anna Vladimirovna, witness
Igor Gasparian – body used for returning to the world of the living
Yuri Itskov – August Karlovich, the keeper of bodies
Yuri Orlov – judge
Jana Sexte – Lilith
Vitaly Kovalenko – Denis Rybakov
Era Ziganshina – body, woman in the cemetery
Sergei Bysgu – Presbyter Pretorius, defendant
Igor Chernevich – Herman Borisovich Kashin (bore), the defendant
Ksenia Katalymova – bartender Tatiana

External links

References

Russian legal television series
Supernatural television series
Ghosts in television
2011 Russian television series debuts
2014 Russian television series endings
2010s Russian television series
Russian drama television series
Russian fantasy television series
2010s legal television series